The 2017–18 Oklahoma State Cowgirls basketball team represented Oklahoma State University in the 2017–18 NCAA Division I women's basketball season. The Cowgirls, led by seventh year head coach Jim Littell, played their home games at Gallagher-Iba Arena and were members of the Big 12 Conference. They finished the season 21–11, 11–7 in Big 12 play to finish in a tie for third place. They lost in the quarterfinals of the Big 12 women's tournament to West Virginia. They received an at-large bid of the NCAA women's basketball tournament where they defeated Syracuse in the first round before losing to Mississippi State in the second round.

Previous season
For the 2016-17 season, Oklahoma State finished 17-15, 6-12 in the Big 12 and finished 7th in the conference standings. The Cowgirls were eliminated in the quarterfinals of the Big 12 women's tournament, losing to #12 Texas. They did not make the NCAA women's tournament, instead, they were selected to be in the 2017 WNIT as an at-large bid. They played at home against Abilene Christian. They lost in the first round 56-66 in an upset against Abilene Christian.

Roster

Schedule and results

|-
! colspan=9 style="background:#000000; color:#FF6600;"|Exhibition

|-
!colspan=9 style="background:#000000; color:#FF6600;"| Non-conference regular season

|-
! colspan=9 style="background:#000000; color:#FF6600;"| Big 12 Regular Season

|-
! colspan=9 style="background:#000000; color:#FF6600;"| Big 12 Conference tournament

|-
!colspan=12 style="background:#000000; color:#FF6600;"| NCAA Women's Tournament

Rankings
2017–18 NCAA Division I women's basketball rankings

See also
 2017–18 Oklahoma State Cowboys basketball team

References

2017-18
2017–18 Big 12 Conference women's basketball season
2017 in sports in Oklahoma
2018 in sports in Oklahoma
Oklahoma State